{{Infobox television
| image          =
| image_upright  = 
| image_alt      = 
| caption        = 
| genre          = Drama anthology
| alt_name       = 
| based_on       = 
| screenplay     = 
| story          = 
| director       = 
| starring       = 
| narrated       = 
| music          = 
| country        = Canada
| language       = English
| num_episodes   = 51
| producer       = {{Plainlist|
Ralph Thomas
Stephen Patrick
Sam Levene
Sig Gerber
(executive producers)<ref name="Henley">{{cite journal |last1=Henley |first1=Gail |title=On the record: For the Records 10 distinctive years. |journal=Cinema Canada |date=April 1985 |pages=18–21 |url=http://cinemacanada.athabascau.ca/index.php/cinema/article/download/2808/2851. |access-date=4 July 2020}}</ref>
}}
| editor         = 
| cinematography = 
| runtime        = 
| company        = CBC Television
| distributor    = 
| budget         = 
| network        = 
| first_aired    = 
| last_aired     =  
}}For the Record''' is a Canadian television drama anthology series that aired on CBC Television from 1976 to 1986. The series aired docudrama-style television films on contemporary social issues, typically airing between four and six films per year.

The series was cancelled in 1985, although the CBC opted to continue commissioning similar television films as standalone productions, beginning with 1986's Turning to Stone.

ConceptFor the Record was intended as a series of dramas which would take an honest look at problems in Canadian society, among them many about mental illness and "flawed social institutions".

Critical assessment
Gail Henley remarked in 1985 that For the Record'' dramas were "information laden" when compared to their more emotional American counterparts and emphasises the importance of research and documentation for the series. As Bill MacVicar put it:Topicality is both a blessing and a bane for television. Since the time from concept to telecast can be much shorter than for movies, television appears better briefed and more up-to-date. But the voraciousness of the medium encourages clumsy or cynical abuse of topicality; all too often (as in the slack Lou Grant the mere act of raising an issue is assumed to be tantamount to solving it; in other cases, solutions are so slickly simplified that what purports to be an investigation is little more than a case of special pleading. In contrast to this frequent shortcoming, the CBC's For the Record series tends to do justice to the problems it airs.

Episodes

1976

1977

1978

1979

1980

1981

1982

1983

1984

1985

References

External links

1970s Canadian anthology television series
CBC Television original programming
1976 Canadian television series debuts
1986 Canadian television series endings
1980s Canadian anthology television series
Canadian television docudramas